Eldora Township is one of fifteen townships in Surry County, North Carolina, United States. The township had a population of 3,541 according to the 2000 census.

Geographically, Eldora Township occupies  in central Surry County.  Eldora Township is separated from Long Hill Township on the east by the Ararat River.  There are no incorporated municipalities within Eldora Township; however, there are several smaller, unincorporated communities located here, including Ash Hill, Blackwater and Pine Hill.

Townships in Surry County, North Carolina
Townships in North Carolina